Asiavision Awards have been held annually since 2006 to honor the artistes and technicians of Indian cinema and television & is organized under the leadership of renowned journalist Nissar Syed.

More than 40,000 people across United Arab Emirates attended the 2012 Movie awards which was held on 9 November 2012 at Sharjah cricket stadium. Mohanlal and Rima Kallingal won Best Actors and Juhi Chawla and Shruti Haasan won excellence awards. In 2013 Asiavision Movie Awards was held at Dubai festival city, where Mammootty won Best Actor for Kunjananthante kada and Kavya Madhavan won best actress for Bavuttiyude Namathil. Bollywood actor John Abraham won Icon of the year and Rani Mukerji won excellence in Hindi cinema for Talaash and Bombay talkies. Preity Zinta won Pride of Bollywood award and Karisma Kapoor was one among the chief guests. In 2009, the first edition of Asiavision Television Awards started at Sharjah cricket stadium where Oscar Award winner Resul Pookutty attended as chief guest. The 4th and 5th edition of Television Awards witnessed the presence of Mohanlal and Karisma Kapoor along with the television celebrities of Malayalam television industry. 
On February 8, 2017, the first edition of Asiavision Radio Awards was launched, where leading Malayalam radio stations representatives were honored. Kareena Kapoor was awarded with Icon of India.
On November 14, 2014 9th Edition of Asiavision Movie Awards held at Sharjah cricket stadium and Aishwarya Rai Bachchan  was honored with Icon Of India Dhanush was presented Youth Icon of India male and Shruti Haasan was given Youth Icon of India female. Best actor award was won by Mammootty for his outstanding performance in the movie Munnariyippu and Best actress award was won by Manju Warrier for her come back movie How old are you
Asiavision movie awards 2015 was held at Sharjah cricket stadium on 2 December where Prithviraj Sukumaran and Parvathy Thiruvothu were honored with Best actors award for their excellent performance in the movie Ennu Ninte Moideen, which also won best film award. Bollywood actors Jackie Shroff and Tabu won Outstanding Performance award and Imran Khan was presented with Youth Icon of India award.
On 18 November 2016, the 11th edition of Asiavision Film Awards was held at Sharjah cricket stadium, and the leading stars from Malayalam, Tamil, Telugu and Hindi were present. Sonam Kapoor was awarded with best actress-national for her excellent performance in the movie Neerja. Radhika Apte won Outstanding Performer Of The Year and Amy Jackson won Excellence in Indian Cinema award. Tamannaah and Vijay Sethupathi won Best Actor Female and Male Tamil awards respectively for Dharma Durai. In 2017 the movie awards was held at Sharjah cricket stadium and Deepika Padukone was honored with Global Icon of India and Sanjay Dutt was awarded with Most Popular Actor of The Year.

Winners 2011

Winners 2012

Winners 2013

Winners 2014

Winners 2015

Winners 2016
Regional languages
 Best Actress – Sonam Kapoor- Neerja
 Outstanding Performer – Radhika Apte- Parched/ Kabali
 Youth Icon – Ram Charan
 Best Actor in Tamil – Vijay Sethupathi- Dharma Durai
 Best Actress in Tamil – Tamannaah Bhatia- Dharma Durai
 Best Actor in Negative Role – RK Suresh- Thara Thappatai
 Best Film in Tamil – Dharma Durai
 Excellence Award – Amy Jackson- Ai, Theri
 Best Director in Tamil – Seenu Ramasamy - Dharma Durai
 Best Singer in Tamil – Sid Sriram
 Star of the year – Shaheer Sheikh

Winners 2017
12th Asiavision Movie Awards 2017 held on November 24, 2017 at Sharjah Cricket Stadium in the United Arab Emirates.

Winners 2018
13th Asiavision Movie Awards for 2018, which was held in Dubai on 16 February 2019.

References

Indian film awards
Awards established in 2006